Folinella moolenbeeki is a species of sea snail, a marine gastropod mollusk in the family Pyramidellidae, the pyrams and their allies.

Description
The shell size varies between 2 mm and 2.5 mm.

Distribution
This species occurs in the Atlantic Ocean off Mauritania.

References

 Peñas A. & Rolán E. (1998). La familia Pyramidellidae Gray, 1840 (Mollusca, Gastropoda) en África Occidental. 3. El género Chrysallida s.l. Iberus,  suppl. 4 : 1-73

External links
 To Encyclopedia of Life
 To World Register of Marine Species
 

Pyramidellidae
Gastropods described in 1998
Fauna of Mauritania
Molluscs of the Atlantic Ocean